Dichromia legrosi is a moth of the family Erebidae first described by Christian Guillermet in 1992. It is found on Réunion.

A host plant of this species is in the family Urticaceae and genus Boehmeria.

References
"Dichromia legrosi (Guillermet, 1992)". African Moths. Retrieved February 11, 2020.

Hypeninae
Moths of Africa